Frederick George "Ike" Eichrodt (January 6, 1903 – July 14, 1965) was a Major League Baseball outfielder who played for four seasons. He played for the Cleveland Indians from 1925 to 1927 and the Chicago White Sox in 1931.

External links

1903 births
1965 deaths
Major League Baseball outfielders
Cleveland Indians players
Chicago White Sox players
Baseball players from Chicago
Nashville Vols players